Yıldızköy is a village in Mut district of Mersin Province, Turkey. It is to the east of the Göksu River valley in the Taurus Mountains.

References

Villages in Mut District